Palatine School (formerly George Pringle School or Selden County Junior Mixed and Infant School) is a primary school in Worthing, West Sussex for those with Special Educational Needs. It educates 123 children between the ages of 4 and 11.

History
In 1951 the windowless building that housed RAF Durrington, a ground-controlled interception radar station during World War II, was converted into a school building that became the Selden County Junior Mixed and Infant School.

The school then re-opened on 19 June 1964 under the name George Pringle School by Richard Hearne, known under the stage name of Mr Pastry. The site was made up of several semi-permanent buildings and a large permanent building that was formerly the site of RAF Durrington.

In 1997 an additional block, named Hunter Block, was built with four new classrooms.

In 2006 the school underwent major redevelopment and had a large extension build on the main building that was originally the site used for RAF Durrington, removed the semi-permanent buildings and extended the car park.

Uniform
The school  encourage all children at Palatine to wear school uniform, with 'Dress Appropriately' being one of the school rules. For the children, it means “wearing the right clothes for the right job”!

The winter uniform consists of a plain white shirt or polo shirt; black or grey skirt or trousers; a navy blue jumper, cardigan or sweatshirt; strong black shoes; and a waterproof coat.

The summer uniform consists of a blue and white check summer dress, or a short sleeved white or a pale blue shirt, or a polo-shirt; black or grey shorts or trousers; and a plain baseball cap or sun hat.

Friends of Palatine Charity
The Palatine Friends Association is a charitable arm of Palatine School. The charity is registered with the Charity Commission and is registered charity number 1005714. The group is made up of staff and parents.

School Charity Work
The school holds various fundraising days for worthy causes. In 2013 the school raised £215 for Children in Need and £332.80 for Comic Relief.

References
http://www.british-history.ac.uk/report.aspx?compid=18233

Special schools in West Sussex
Community schools in West Sussex
Educational institutions established in 1951
1951 establishments in England